Angiotensin II (Ang II) is a medication that is used to treat hypotension resulting from septic shock or other distributive shock.  It is a synthetic vasoconstrictor peptide that is identical to human hormone angiotensin II  and is marketed under the brand name Giapreza. The Food and Drug Administration approved the use of angiotensin II in December 2017 to treat low blood pressure resulting from septic shock.

The U.S. Food and Drug Administration (FDA) considers it to be a first-in-class medication.

Medical uses 
Angiotensin II is a vasoconstrictor used to increase blood pressure in adults with septic or other distributive shock. Angiotensin II is a naturally occurring hormone secreted as part of the renin-angiotensin system that results in powerful systemic vasoconstriction. The vasopressor effects of angiotensin have been studied since it was first isolated in the late 1930s. Vasopressors are defined as agents that combat vasodilatory shock by inducing peripheral vasoconstriction. Commonly used vasopressors include catecholamine (e.g., dopamine, norepinephrine, epinephrine) and non-catecholamine (e.g., vasopressin). 
but these agents are not always effective in reversing vasodilatory shock, and their use can be associated with significant side effects including limb ischemia and cardiac arrhythmia. Angiotensin II is as a treatment option that can increase blood pressure and allow catecholamine dose reductions. 

Angiotensin II must be administered as an intravenous infusion diluted in 0.9% sodium chloride prior to use. The recommended starting dosage of angiotensin II is 20 nanograms (ng)/kg/min via continuous intravenous infusion. Administration through a central venous line is recommended. Monitor blood pressure response and titrate angiotensin II every 5 minutes by increments of up to 15 ng/kg/min as needed to achieve or maintain target blood pressure.

Adverse effects 
Angiotensin II treated patients are at an increased risk of thromboembolic events. There was a higher incidence of arterial and venous thrombotic and thromboembolic events in patients who received angiotensin II compared to placebo treated patients in the ATHOS-3 study [13% (21/163 patients) vs. 5% (8/158 patients)]. It is recommended that patients be on concurrent venous thromboembolism prophylaxis. Other adverse reactions include  thrombocytopenia, tachycardia, fungal infection, delirium, acidosis, hyperglycemia, and peripheral ischemia.

Angiotensin II acts on Angiotensin receptor (AT1) on presynaptic adrenergic nerves → release of catecholamine → excessive catecholamine can be harmful as it can cause myocyte necrosis.

Interactions
Angiotensin II receptor blockers, as their name implies, block the action of angiotensin II at its receptors and therefore may reduce its effects.

References

External links 
 
 

Antihypotensive agents